Antirhea is a genus of flowering plants in the family Rubiaceae.

Distribution
Species of Antirhea are found in:
 Indian Ocean islands off Africa — Madagascar, Mauritius, Réunion, and Rodrigues.
 North America — the Caribbean and Mexico
 Southeast Asia — southern China, Borneo, the Philippines, New Guinea, and Melanesia

Species

 Antirhea affinis (Zoll.) Chaw
 Antirhea anodon (Miq.) Chaw
 Antirhea aromatica — endemic to Veracruz, Mexico.
 Antirhea atropurpurea (Craib) Chaw
 Antirhea attenuata (Elmer) Chaw
 Antirhea benguetensis (Elmer) Valeton
 Antirhea bifida (Lam.) I.M.Johnst.
 Antirhea bombysia Chaw
 Antirhea borbonica J.F.Gmel.
 Antirhea buruana Chaw
 Antirhea caudata (M.E.Jansen) Chaw
 Antirhea chinensis (Champ. ex Benth.) Benth. & Hook.f.
 Antirhea edanoi Chaw
 Antirhea foveolata Chaw
 Antirhea hexasperma (Roxb.) Merr.
 Antirhea inaequalis Chaw
 Antirhea inconspicua (Seem.) Christoph.
 Antirhea ioensis (Baill.) Chaw
 Antirhea jamaicensis — endemic to Jamaica.
 Antirhea livida Elmer
 Antirhea madagascariensis Chaw
 Antirhea megacarpa Merr. & L.M.Perry
 Antirhea microphylla (Bartl. ex DC.) Merr.
 Antirhea multiflora (M.E.Jansen) Chaw
 Antirhea myrtoides (F.M.Muell.) F.M.Bailey
 Antirhea novobritanniensis (M.E.Jansen) Chaw
 Antirhea ovatifolia (M.E.Jansen) Chaw
 Antirhea paxillata Chaw
 Antirhea philippinensis (Benth.) Rolfe
 Antirhea portoricensis — endemic to Puerto Rico.
 Antirhea putaminosa (F.Muell.) F.Muell.
 Antirhea radiata — native to Cuba and Hispaniola in the Dominican Republic and Haiti.
 Antirhea ramosii Chaw
 Antirhea rhamnoides (Baill.) Chaw
 Antirhea schmutzii (M.E.Jansen) Chaw
 Antirhea sintenisii — endemic to Puerto Rico.
 Antirhea smithii (Fosberg) Merr. & L.M.Perry
 Antirhea sphaerocarpa Chaw
 Antirhea strigosa Korth.
 Antirhea talaudensis Chaw
 Antirhea tayabensis Chaw
 Antirhea tenuiflora F.Muell. ex Benth.
 Antirhea ternata Chaw
 Antirhea tomentosa — endemic to Jamaica.

References

External links
Antirhea in the World Checklist of Rubiaceae

 
Rubiaceae genera
Guettardeae
Taxonomy articles created by Polbot